Anntonia Porsild (born November 3, 1996) is a Thai-Danish model, actress and beauty pageant titleholder who was crowned Miss Supranational 2019. Porsild had previously been crowned Miss Supranational Thailand 2019, making her the first Thai woman to win the Miss Supranational title.

Early life and education

Porsild was born in India to a Danish father Morten Porsild and Thai mother Tanradee (Nee) Porsild.
She has a younger brother named Christopher Porsild. Porsild grew up in several countries: the India, Denmark, Spain, Thailand, and as well as Ho Chi Minh City in Vietnam.

In 2015–2017, Porsild has studied at the International School Ho Chi Minh City in Ho Chi Minh City, Vietnam. Porsild studied public relations and communications at EU Business School in Barcelona, Spain in 2017. She is currently pursuing a Bachelor's degree program, Bachelor of Arts (BA) in Public Relations, Advertising, and Applied Communication from the Stamford International University in Bangkok, Thailand.

Pageantry

Miss Supranational Thailand 2019 
Porsild began her pageantry career in 2019, in the Miss Supranational Thailand 2019 competition. At the end of the event, she was ultimately crowned Miss Supranational Thailand 2019. As the winner, Porsild received the right to represent Thailand at Miss Supranational 2019 in Katowice, Poland.

Miss Supranational 2019
As the winner of Miss Supranational Thailand 2019, Porsild represented Thailand at the 11st edition of the Miss Supranational competition at the Katowice International Congress Centre in Katowice, Poland on December 6, 2019. At the end of the event, Porsild was crowned as the winner by previous titleholder Valeria Vázquez of Puerto Rico. It was Thai's first woman to be crowned Miss Supranational.

Awards and nomination

References

External links

 
 Miss Supranational's official website

Living people
1996 births
Danish models
Miss Supranational winners
Anntonia Porsild
Anntonia Porsild
Anntonia Porsild
Anntonia Porsild
Anntonia Porsild